The 2019 Tunbridge Wells Borough Council election took place on 2 May 2019 to elect one third of Tunbridge Wells Borough Council in England. The Conservatives retained control of the council, but with a reduced majority.

Results summary

Results by Ward

Benenden and Cranbook

Culverden

Frittenden and Sissinghurst

Goudhurst and Lamberhurst

Hawkhurst and Sandhurst

Paddock Wood East

Paddock Wood West

Pantiles and St. Mark's

Park

Pembury

Rusthall

Sherwood

Southborough and High Brooms

Southborough North

Speldhurst and Bidborough

St. John's

References 

Tunbridge
Tunbridge Wells Borough Council elections